Lara Klopčič (born 3 August 2001) is a Slovenian footballer who plays as a defender for the Slovenia women's national team.

References

2001 births
Living people
Slovenian women's footballers
Women's association football defenders
Slovenia women's international footballers